The 2019 Music Awards Ceremony (often simply called the MAC) is the first edition of the annual awards presented by Belgrade-based company, Sky Music to recognize achievements in the regional music industry of former Yugoslavia of the eligibility year, which ran from January 1, 2017, to August 30, 2018. The event, sponsored by Huawei, was held on 29 January 2019 at Štark Arena in Belgrade. The 2019 MAC was presented by Serbian musician Zvonimir Đukić, Croatian singer and presenter Ida Prester, and Bosnian presenter Aida Jokanović.

All income from tickets sales and SMS votes was donated to UNICEF.

Performances

Categories and nominees
Winners are listed first and are highlighted bold.

Public vote-based categories

Other awards

References

2019 music awards
Music festivals in Serbia